Nardin is a census-designated place (CDP) and unincorporated community in Kay County, Oklahoma, United States. Its population was 52 as of the 2010 census.

Demographics

References

Census-designated places in Kay County, Oklahoma
Census-designated places in Oklahoma
Unincorporated communities in Oklahoma
Unincorporated communities in Kay County, Oklahoma